Idhu Namma Aalu (She is my lover) is a 2016 Indian Tamil-language romantic comedy film written, co-produced and directed by Pandiraj. The film stars Nayantara, Silambarasan and Andrea Jeremiah, while Soori and Jayaprakash portray supporting roles. This film was produced by T. Rajender and music was composed by Kuralarasan. This film was highly anticipated from audience and opened with mixed reviews but became an average success at the box office.

Plot
Shiva (Silambarasan) is an IT engineer with Vaasu (Soori) as his driver and colleague. He visits Myla (Nayanthara) for a marriage proposal and instantly likes her. Myla wishes to speak to him privately and asks him about Priya (Andrea Jeremiah), his ex-girlfriend. Shiva accepts his old love for her. He then leaves the house thinking the marriage will not happen, but Myla accepts the marriage proposal. Later, they start speaking on the phone, and Shiva tells his old love story and how they broke up. Myla starts loving Shiva deeply and in the beginning tests him, and later they are love locked couple. One day both their parents fight about a trivial issue, and the marriage is cancelled. Myla attempts suicide as she does not want to give up Shiva but is saved by his father (Jayaprakash). Myla and Shiva reunite and marry. As the story moves, they are made to marry three times. They finally have a child and live happily when the movie ends

Cast

 Nayantara as Myla
 Silambarasan as Shiva
 Andrea Jeremiah as Priya
 Soori as Vaasu
 Arjunan as Shiva's friend
 Jayaprakash as Shiva's father 
 Uday Mahesh as Mylaa's father
 Dheepa Ramanujam as Mylaa's mother 
 Madhusudhan Rao as Priya's father
 Satyam Rajesh as Shiva's and Vaasu's friend
 Amuthaavaani Arumugam
 Jai as Surya, Mylaa's relative (guest appearance)
 Santhanam as Sherlock Holmes (cameo appearance)
 Adah Sharma in a special appearance in the song "Maaman Waiting"
 Pandiraj as Corporate Official (guest appearance)

Production
Pandiraj had written a love story and approached Silambarasan to play the lead role in the film, after his friend Poster Nandakumar helped set up a meeting. Reports of a collaboration between Silambarasan and Pandiraj first surfaced in the media during April 2013, and subsequently it was revealed that the pair would work on a romantic film to be produced by T. Rajender under Silambarasan's home production studio. Kuralarasan, Rajender's second son and Silambarasan's younger brother, was signed by Rajendar to make his debut as the film's music composer during July 2013. Pandiraj continued to work on the script throughout the middle of 2013. Comedians Soori and Santhanam were also revealed to be a part of the film, in an official press note, which confirmed that Balasubramaniem and Praveen K. L. would handle the cinematography and editing respectively. Aware that he and Silambarasan had different working styles, Pandiraj revealed that he told the actor that the film had to be completed within four months and Silambarasan was receptive of the idea.

Silambarasan began filming his portions from October 2013 alongside Soori in Urapakkam, and worked on the film during the day before joining the team of Achcham Enbadhu Madamaiyada (2016) during the night time in the period. The first schedule was completed without a lead actress, and the second schedule was briefly delayed as Pandiraj weighed up his options on his casting decision. The film's cinematographer Balasubrameniem had discussed the film's plot with Udhayanidhi Stalin during the making of Idhu Kathirvelan Kadhal (2014), and Stalin had convinced the actress of that film, Nayantara, to meet Pandiraj. Subsequently, Nayantara signed on to be a part of the film during November 2013, agreeing to work with Silambarasan for the first time since their break-up, with the news creating increased hype around the project. The team shot at Sathyam Cinemas during late December 2013, with Pandiraj revealing that the film would feature several scenes depicting Silambarasan and Nayantara speaking through phone conversations. By the end of 2013, Pandiraj revealed that 40 percent of the film was completed and disclosed that the film was being developed under the title of Idhu Namma Aalu, but had no resemblance to the 1988 Bhagyaraj film of the same name.

By April 2014, the film was seventy percent complete. Pandiraj began casting for a second lead actress during the middle of 2014 and held discussions with Bindu Madhavi and Taapsee Pannu, before finalising on Andrea Jeremiah. Actor Jai also shot for the film, and took part in a single day's shoot with Silambarasan, Nayanthara and Andrea. The project first ran into production troubles during July 2014, when Silambarasan had changed his hairstyle in-between schedule breaks, leaving Pandiraj unhappy. Silambarasan subsequently disclosed to the media that Idhu Namma Aalu was his production and that others should not question his involvement in the project. Despite a brief tussle, the final schedule of the talkie portion began in August 2014. In December 2014, Pandiraj announced that the film, including post-production works, were complete and that he was waiting for the songs from Kuralarasan, in order to release the film by February 2015.

In January 2015, Pandiraj tweeted about his annoyance at Kuralarasan's delay in providing the film's music and stated that a planned teaser scheduled for the month had to be delayed. The director and music composer later exchanged tweets blaming each other for the slow progress of the film. T. Rajendar also submitted a complaint to the Nadigar Sangam during September 2015 remarking that Nayantara was refusing to take part in the shoot of a song. Pandiraj came to her defense, arguing that Nayantara had wasted almost two years on the film due to the producers' poor organization and was still yet to be paid for her work. He further stated that the song in question was an extra kuthu number that the script did not warrant. Silambarasan later shot the song with Adah Sharma during early March 2016, after the actress was given a further small character in the film.

Reception

Critical response 
In his review for The Hindu, a critic Baradwaj Rangan said, "Simbu and Nayanthara are in good form, and they keep us watching. And wondering". Behindwoods rated 2.75 out of 5 stars with the verdict "A breezy youthful entertainer which engages the audience fairly well with a lot of humor". Indiaglitz rated 2.8 out of 5 stars with the verdict "Idhu Namma Aalu is a decent romantic entertainer, mixes the right dosage of fun, love and enough mockery on Simbu who gives it a personal touch with a smile."

Box office
The film grossed approximately 1.83 crore in Chennai.

Soundtrack

The music was composed by Kuralarasan. There are 6 songs in this movie. Idhu Namma Aalu is a debut film for TR Kulalarasan as a music director, singer and lyricist.

References

External links
 

2010s Tamil-language films
2016 films
Films directed by Pandiraj
Indian romantic comedy films
2016 romantic comedy films